Bart Straalman (born 22 August 1996) is a Dutch professional footballer who plays as a centre back for Grenoble Foot 38. Besides the Netherlands, he has played in Norway and France.

Club career
Born Winterswijk, Straalman is a youth product from De Graafschap. Straalman made his first team debut on 8 November 2014 in an Eerste Divisie game against Sparta Rotterdam replacing Vlatko Lazić after 87 minutes in a 3–2 home win.

On 11 July 2019, Straalman signed for Norwegian Eliteserien club Sarpsborg 08 on a contract until the end of the 2019 season.

In April 2020, having made just four appearances for Ligue 2 side Rodez AF before the season was ended early due to COVID-19 pandemic, Straalman agreed a two-contract with league rivals Grenoble Foot 38 which he would join for the 2020–21 season.

References

1996 births
Living people
People from Winterswijk
Footballers from Gelderland
Association football central defenders
Dutch footballers
De Graafschap players
Eredivisie players
Eerste Divisie players
Derde Divisie players
Eliteserien players
Ligue 2 players
Sarpsborg 08 FF players
Rodez AF players
Grenoble Foot 38 players
Dutch expatriate footballers
Expatriate footballers in Norway
Dutch expatriate sportspeople in Norway
Dutch expatriate sportspeople in France
Expatriate footballers in France